Aynsley is both a given name and a surname. Notable people with the name include:

 Aynsley Dunbar, English drummer 
 Aynsley Lister, English blues-rock guitarist/singer and songwriter 
 Cecil Aynsley, 20th century Australian rugby league footballer
 Eugene Aynsley Goossens, English conductor and composer 
 John Aynsley, English potter

See also
 Lord Charles Murray-Aynsley, English dean
 Hugh Murray-Aynsley, 19th-century Member of Parliament in Canterbury, New Zealand.
 Ainslie
 Ainslee
 Ansley
 Annesley (disambiguation)